Recently, in the academic year 2011–2012, a new engineering college was started in Davangere called Jain Institute of Technology. It is affiliated to Visvesvaraya Technological University and approved by the All India Council for Technical Education.

Disciplines
The college provides four years full-time Bachelor of Engineering (B.E) degrees in the following streams:

 Civil Engineering
 Mechanical Engineering  
 Electronics Engineering 
 Computer Science Engineering 
 Electrical Engineering

PG programmes
M.B.A.

Besides B.E programs, the college also provides a two-year full-time Master of Business Administration.

References

Jain universities and colleges
Engineering colleges in Karnataka
Universities and colleges in Davanagere district
Education in Davangere
Educational institutions established in 2011
2011 establishments in Karnataka